Events in the year 1901 in Germany.

Incumbents

National level
 Kaiser – Wilhelm II
 Chancellor – Bernhard von Bülow

State level

Kingdoms
 King of Bavaria – Otto of Bavaria
 King of Prussia – Kaiser Wilhelm II
 King of Saxony – Albert of Saxony
 King of Württemberg – William II of Württemberg

Grand duchies
 Grand Duke of Baden – Frederick I
 Grand Duke of Hesse – Ernest Louis
 Grand Duke of Mecklenburg-Schwerin – Frederick Francis IV
 Grand Duke of Mecklenburg-Strelitz – Frederick William
 Grand Duke of Oldenburg – Frederick Augustus II
 Grand Duke of Saxe-Weimar-Eisenach – Charles Alexander to 5 January, then William Ernest

Principalities
 Schaumburg-Lippe – George, Prince of Schaumburg-Lippe
 Schwarzburg-Rudolstadt – Günther Victor, Prince of Schwarzburg-Rudolstadt
 Schwarzburg-Sondershausen – Karl Günther, Prince of Schwarzburg-Sondershausen
 Principality of Lippe – Alexander, Prince of Lippe (with Ernest II, Count of Lippe-Biesterfeld as regent)
 Reuss Elder Line – Heinrich XXII, Prince Reuss of Greiz
 Reuss Younger Line – Heinrich XIV, Prince Reuss Younger Line
 Waldeck and Pyrmont – Friedrich, Prince of Waldeck and Pyrmont

Duchies
 Duke of Anhalt – Frederick I, Duke of Anhalt
 Duke of Brunswick – Prince Albert of Prussia (regent)
 Duke of Saxe-Altenburg – Ernst I, Duke of Saxe-Altenburg
 Duke of Saxe-Coburg and Gotha – Charles Edward, Duke of Saxe-Coburg and Gotha
 Duke of Saxe-Meiningen – Georg II, Duke of Saxe-Meiningen

Colonial governors
 Cameroon (Kamerun) – Jesko von Puttkamer (7th term)
 Kiaochow (Kiautschou) – Otto Jäschke to 27 January, then Max Rollmann (acting) to 8 June, then Oskar von Truppel
 German East Africa (Deutsch-Ostafrika) – Eduard von Liebert to 12 March, then Gustav Adolf von Götzen
 German New Guinea (Deutsch-Neuguinea) – Rudolf von Bennigsen to 10 July, then Albert Hahl (acting governor) (2nd term)
 German Samoa (Deutsch-Samoa) – Wilhelm Solf
 German South-West Africa (Deutsch-Südwestafrika) – Theodor Leutwein
 Togoland - August Köhler

Events
 23 February – Germany agrees the frontier between German East Africa and the British colony of Nyasaland with the United Kingdom.
 6 March – Kaiser Wilhelm II survives an assassination attempt in Bremen.
 10 July – Bielathal, Königstein, Saxony, launches the world's first regular passenger-carrying trolleybus service.
 25 November – Dr. Alois Alzheimer examines Auguste Deter, eventually leading to a diagnosis of the condition that will carry Alzheimer's name.

Births

 11 January – Henning von Tresckow, German army officer and anti-Hitler conspirator (died 1944) 
 12 January – Karl Künstler, Nazi concentration camp commandant (died 1945)
 19 January – Fred Uhlman, German-English writer, painter and lawyer (died 1985)
 25 March – Yeshayahu Forder, German—Israeli lawyer and politician (died 1970)
 21 May – Manfred Aschner, German—Israeli microbiologist and entomologist (died 1989)
 27 May – Georg August Zinn, German politician (died 1976)
 8 October – Adolf Weidmann, German athlete and sports official (died 1997)
 15 October – Hermann Josef Abs, German banker (d. 1994)
 5 December – Werner Heisenberg, German physicist (died 1976)
 27 December – Marlene Dietrich, German actress and singer (died 1992)
 Undated — Yohanan Levi, German-born Hebrew linguist and historian, specializing in the Second Temple period (died 1945)

Deaths

 5 January – Charles Alexander, Grand Duke of Saxe-Weimar-Eisenach (born 1818).
 27 January – Otto Jäschke, governor of Kiaochow (Kiautschou)
 10 February – Max von Pettenkofer, Bavarian chemist and hygienist (born 1818)
 6 July – Chlodwig, Prince of Hohenlohe-Schillingsfürst, German politician, Chancellor of Germany (born 1819)
 5 August - Empress Frederick, mother of Emperor Wilhelm II (born 1840 in the United Kingdom)
 21 August – Adolf Eugen Fick, German-born physician and physiologist (born 1829)
 23 October – Georg von Siemens, German banker (born 1839)
 28 October – Paul Rée, German author and philosopher (born 1849)
 25 November – Josef Gabriel Rheinberger, German composer (born 1839)
 6 December – Bertha Wehnert-Beckmann, German photographer (born 1815)

References

 
Years of the 20th century in Germany
Germany
Germany